Nationality words link to articles with information on the nation's poetry or literature (for instance, Irish or France).

Events

New works
c. 1350:
Baudouin de Sebourc (French, probably from Hainaut)
The Tale of Gamelyn (Middle English)
c. 1352:
Wynnere and Wastoure (Middle English)
1355
Guillaume de Deguileville – Le Pèlerinage de l'Âme

Births
Death years link to the corresponding "[year] in poetry" article. There are conflicting or unreliable sources for the birth years of many people born in this period; where sources conflict, the poet is listed again and the conflict is noted:

1350:
 Andrew of Wyntoun, also known as Andrew Wyntoun (died 1423), Scottish poet, a canon and prior

1352:
 Vemana born around 1352 (approx.) (died unknown), Telugu poet
 Vidyapati, also known as Vidyapati Thakur and called Maithil Kavi Kokil "the poet cuckoo of Maithili", (born 1448), Indian, Maithili-language poet and Sanskrit writer

1355:
 Anselm Turmeda, also known as "Abd-Allah at-Tarjuman" عبد الله الترجمان (died 1423), a poet who wrote in both Catalan Spanish and, after converting to Islam, in Arabic

1357:
 Hugo von Montfort (died 1423), Austrian minstrel and representative of the German Minnesang (songwriters and poets)

Deaths
Birth years link to the corresponding "[year] in poetry" article:

1350:
 Janabai (born unknown), Marāthi religious poet in the Hindu tradition in India
 Juan Ruiz (born 1283), known as the Archpriest of Hita (Arcipreste de Hita), was a medieval Spanish poet
 Jyotirishwar Thakur (born 1290), Sanskrit poet and an early  Maithili writer

1351:
 Musō Soseki (born 1275), Rinzai Zen Buddhist monk and teacher, and a calligraphist, poet and garden designer

1352:
 Khwaju Kermani (born 1280), Persian Sufi
 Shiwu (born 1272), Chinese Chan poet and hermit

1356:
 Nasiruddin Chiragh Dehlavi (born 1274), mystic-poet and a Sufi Saint of Chishti Order
 Zheng Yunduan (born 1327), Chinese poet in the Yuan Dynasty

See also

 Poetry
 14th century in poetry
 14th century in literature
 List of years in poetry
 Grands Rhétoriqueurs
 French Renaissance literature
 Renaissance literature
 Spanish Renaissance literature

Other events:
 Other events of the 14th century
 Other events of the 15th century

15th century:
 15th century in poetry
 15th century in literature

Notes

14th-century poetry
Poetry